Charles Wooley (born 1948) is a Scottish-Australian journalist, reporter, writer, TV personality and radio presenter who reported for Channel Nine's 60 Minutes.

Early life and career 
Wooley was born on the Isle of Arran in Scotland, and moved to Launceston, Tasmania aged three. At the age of 16 Wooley moved to Hobart where he gained an honours degree in history from the University of Tasmania. While he was studying he developed his journalistic skills by editing the university's student newspaper, Togatus, and was a member of the student theatre group, the Old Nick Company. He moved to Launceston in 1970 to work as a cadet with The Examiner.

Two years later he joined ABC Radio and moved to Perth. He soon moved to television working on This Day Tonight, Nationwide, and Four Corners. He then served as the ABC's European correspondent based in London.

In 1986 he joined Channel Nine where he worked on Sunday and then A Current Affair. Wooley joined 60 Minutes in 1993.

His 2018 interview with New Zealand Prime Minister Jacinda Ardern was described as 'Sexist', and 'creepy'

Wooley was elected as Deputy Mayor and Councillor of the Sorell Council at the 2022 Tasmanian Local Government Elections.

Author
He published a book of stories of his time travelling the world as a reporter called Travelling Tales. Wooley returned to Hobart in 1999 with his second wife Alona to raise their three children.

Radio
From January 2006 until November 2008, Wolley hosted of Macquarie Regional RadioWorks' regional morning program, Charles Wooley Across Australia. The show aired 9am to 12pm weekdays on over 40 radio stations across Australia.

As well as presenting his radio show, Charles Wooley continues to work on a casual basis for 60 Minutes and also narrates some television programs for Channel 9. He is also the author of several books, including an up-and-coming guide to walks in and around Hobart, Tasmania.

Personal life
Wooley is the father of six children. His daughter Anna Wooley is a documentary film maker.

References

External links
Charles Wooley Blog
Charles Wooley Myspace page

1948 births
Living people
Australian television presenters
University of Tasmania alumni
Scottish emigrants to Australia
60 Minutes (Australian TV program) correspondents